Myra Lee Jia Wen is a Singaporean diver.

In 2010, Myra participated in the 2010 Summer Youth Olympics in Singapore. She managed to overcome a back injury she suffered during the preliminary round of the Girls' 10m platform and competed in the finals. However, the injury affected her performance and she finished last.

In 2013, Myra took part in the 2013 Southeast Asian Games along with her partner Fong Kay Yian in the Women's synchronized 3 m springboard event which the duo won the bronze medal.

A year later, she competed in the 2014 Asian Games Women's 1 metre springboard and Women's 3 metre springboard. She also took part in the Women's synchronized 3 metre springboard with Fong Kay Yian.

At the 2015 Southeast Asian Games, she won a silver medal in the Women's synchronized 10 m platform event with her partner Freida Lim Shen-Yan.

References 

1994 births
Living people
Singaporean female divers
Divers at the 2010 Summer Youth Olympics
Singaporean sportspeople of Chinese descent
Divers at the 2014 Asian Games
Divers at the 2018 Asian Games
Southeast Asian Games silver medalists for Singapore
Southeast Asian Games bronze medalists for Singapore
Southeast Asian Games medalists in diving
Competitors at the 2013 Southeast Asian Games
Competitors at the 2015 Southeast Asian Games
Asian Games competitors for Singapore